Puli kali (Meaning: Leopard Dance) is a recreational folk art from the state of Kerala, India. It is performed by trained artists to entertain people on the occasion of Onam, an annual harvest festival, celebrated mainly in the Indian state of Kerala. On the fourth day of Onam celebrations (Naalaam Onam or Vishakham), performers painted like tigers and leopards in bright yellow, red, and black shake their bellies and dance to the beats of instruments like Udukku and Thakil. Literal meaning of Pulikkali is 'The tiger dance' hence the performance revolve around the theme of tiger hunting. Folk art is mainly practiced in Thrissur district of Kerala. The best place to watch the show is at Thrissur on the fourth day of Onam, where Pulikkali troupes from all over the district assemble to display their skills. The festival attracts thousands of people to the Thrissur city. Pulikkali is also performed during various other festive seasons.

History

The origin of Pulikkali dates back to over 200 years, when the Maharaja Rama Varma Sakthan Thampuran, the then Maharaja of Cochin, is said to have introduced the folk art. They used to perform the art form decked as tigers with peculiar steps resembling the tiger, then known as 'Pulikkettikali' which was immensely enjoyed by the locals. Pulikkali in Thrissur is held in memory of this event.

Modern

Over the years, there have been changes in the adornment of Pulikali dancers. In the early days, masks were not used and participants would have themselves painted all over, on their faces as well. But now, ready-made masks, cosmetic teeth, tongues, beards, and mustaches are used by the participants along with the paint on their bodies. The tigers also wear a broad belt with jingles around their waist. The festival in Thrissur has now become an all peoples event with a huge response from people, especially youths who come forward to participate in the festival, and also from sponsors. The event is organized by the Pulikkali Co-ordination Committee, a unified council of Pulikkali groups formed in 2004 in Thrissur to preserve and propagate the art in all its true hues and tones. The Thrissur Municipal Corporation gives a grant of Rs 30,000($400) for each Pulikkali troupe.

Usually, men and children perform this art form. For the first time, 3 women among a 51 member team participated in the Pulikali at Thrissur in 2016.

Due to COVID-19 and lockdown restrictions, many Onam celebrations were put off. Under the initiative of Ayyanthole Desham Pulikkali Samithy, Pulikali was live-streamed on their Facebook page. About 17 people took part in the dance virtually from various locations.

Preparations
A striking feature of this folk art is the colorful appearance of the performers. A particular combination of tempera powder and varnish or enamel is used to make the paint. First of all, the dancers remove the hair from the body, and then, the base coat of paint is applied to them. It takes two to three hours for the coating to dry. After that, the second coat of paint is applied with an enhanced design. This entire procedure takes at least five to seven hours. A large number of artists gather to apply paint on the tigers. It is a meticulous process and often starts in the wee hours of the morning. By afternoon the Pulikkali groups or 'sangams' as they are called, from all four corners of Thrissur move in a procession, dancing, bouncing and shaking their bellies to the beat of the drums through the streets to the Swaraj Round, Thrissur situated in the heart of the city through Palace Road, Karunakaran Nambiar Road, Shornur Road, A R Menon Road, and MG Road.

Scenes such as the tiger preying on an animal, and a tiger being hunted by a game-hunter are enacted beautifully in between. Thousands of spectators line the streets enjoying the dance, cheering the dancers some of them even trying to join in.
The groups assemble at Naduvilal in the Swaraj Round, Thrissur in front of the Vadakkunnathan Temple and offer a coconut each to the deity of the Ganapati shrine (Naduvilal Ganapati Kovil) here, before going on a procession around the ground. The procession also includes floats from each village. The different troupes vie with each other to make the best floats as well as the best-dressed tigers.

See also
 Hulivesha
 Onam
 Thrissur
 Kerala

References

External links

Hindu festivals in Kerala
Culture of Thrissur
Festivals in Thrissur district
1886 establishments in India
September observances
August observances
Recurring events established in 1886